Andrew Fisher (born 28 December 1979) is an English political adviser and researcher, writer, and trade unionist. He served as Director of Policy of the Labour Party, under leader Jeremy Corbyn, from 2015 to 2019.

Early life
Fisher was born in Portsmouth, Hampshire and grew up in Worthing, West Sussex. He holds a Master of Arts in Politics.

Professional career
Fisher worked as a parliamentary researcher for six years, and was policy officer at the Public and Commercial Services (PCS) trade union. According to Labour List, in 2006 he co-founded the Left Economics Advisory Panel (LEAP), a body chaired by John McDonnell. 

After Jeremy Corbyn became Leader of the Labour Party in September 2015, Fisher was appointed as an adviser. In November 2015, he was suspended from the Labour Party, following complaints from other Labour party members, for appearing to endorse a Class War candidate in the May 2015 general election.  In a statement, Corbyn stated that he still had full confidence in him.  Fisher apologised and said that he had been misinterpreted. His suspension was lifted by the Labour National Executive Committee later in the month, and he was issued with a warning. 

On 21 September 2019, he announced that he was resigning before the end of the year to spend more time with his family.  He had a key role in the party's campaign in the December 2019 general election.

Writing
Fisher has also maintained a blog at LEAP Economics. He is the author of The Failed Experiment: And How to Build an Economy that Works, a book published in 2014 about the financial crisis of 2007–2008. According to one reviewer, the book "argues for the urgent need for a fundamental democratisation of the economy, and recognises this will require a re-intensification of popular struggles."

Fisher wrote an online article for The Guardian in the aftermath of the 2019 general election, published on 17 December 2019. He wrote another which was published on 18 January 2020, regarding the 2020 Labour Party deputy leadership election.

In The i on 17 February 2020, he wrote regarding the legacy of Tony Blair and New Labour.

Television
Fisher appeared on the BBC's Politics Live on 13 January 2020, with Steve Baker, Anneliese Dodds and Sarah Baxter. He was also interviewed by Katie Razzall for the BBC's Newsnight on 17 January 2020, regarding the 2020 Labour Party leadership election.

Personal life
Fisher is married with a son and has lived in Croydon since 2006.

References

External links
Blog maintained by Fisher at LEAP Economics

Living people
1979 births
Advisors
English activists
English political writers
Labour Party (UK) people
People from Worthing
Trade unionists from Hampshire
Trade unionists from Sussex
Writers from Portsmouth
British republicans
Labour Party (UK) officials